The Union Bulldogs and Lady Bulldogs are the athletic teams that represent Union College, located in Barbourville, Kentucky, in intercollegiate sports as a member of the National Association of Intercollegiate Athletics (NAIA), primarily competing in the Appalachian Athletic Conference (AAC) for most of its sports since the 2002–03 academic year; while its men's & women's bowling and archery teams compete in the Mid-South Conference (MSC), which they previously competed as a full member from 1995–96 to 2001–02.

Varsity teams
Union College competes in 22 intercollegiate varsity sports: Men's sports include baseball, basketball, bowling, cross country, football, golf, soccer, swimming & diving, tennis and track & field; while women's sports include basketball, bowling, cross country, golf, soccer, softball, swimming & diving, tennis, track & field and volleyball; and co-ed sports include archery and cheerleading. Former sports included men's lacrosse, co-ed cycling and co-ed dance. Intramural sports vary according to student request.

Notable people
 Derek Smith, an American soccer player who currently plays for Cincinnati Kings in the USL Premier Development League.

References

External links
 

 
Union College (Kentucky)